San Pietro is a Roman Catholic church in central Piacenza, Emilia Romagna, Italy. The church was built over the site of an ancient church titled San Pietro in Foro (St Peter of the Roman Forum).

History
A church was present at the site, which included the old Roman forum by 809, but it was rebuilt after a fire in 1174. In about 1583, Duke Ranuccio I Farnese had invited the Jesuits into the duchy, and ceded them the church. They razed the ancient structure and replaced it with the present church with construction spanning from 1585 and 1587. The belltower dates to the 17th century. In 1607, the Jesuits founded a seminary at this site. However, in 1768 the order was expelled from the duchy. While the Jesuits returned some decades after the Napoleonic wars, they remained briefly until 1848 at the church of San Pietro. Since 1893, San Pietro was made a parish church. In the early decades of the 1900 the church underwent further restoration work, including of the present façade.

In the guide of 1842, the church is said to contain:
First chapel on right
St Aloysius Gonzaga and St Joseph and Child Jesus: altarpieces by Giovanni Battista Tagliasacchi
 San Francis copy of painting by Podesti
Second chapel on right
St Francis Xavier by Clemente Ruta
Chapel on right accessed below choir
Statue of Santa Filomena by Graziani
St Ursula by Marcantonio Franceschini
Saints Peter and Paul being led to Martyrdom by Ercole Graziani
Organ (1847) by brothers Serassi of Bergamo
Chapel of St Ignatius
St Ignatius by Tagliasacchi
Sacred Heart of Christ- sculpture by Gaspare Landi
Chapel of St Stanislaus Kostka
Depiction of Saint by Giovanni Gioseffo dal Sole
Chapel of the Congregation
Annunciation by school of Guido Reni
Relics of San Regius Martyr
Archangel Raphael and Tobias by Giovanni Bottani

The adjacent Palazzo del Collegio dei Gesuiti was completed in 1593, and now houses the Biblioteca Comunale Passerini Landi. In 1840s, the library was said to house thousands of volumes of sacred and profane books, as well as private letters and manuscripts.

Interior
In the chancel there are frescoes by Roberto de Longe and a baroque main altar derives from a chapel of the cathedral .

An inventory from the 1840s, noted that the church contained an altarpieces of St Aloysius Gonzaga and St Joseph with child Jesus in his arms by Giovanni Battista Tagliasacchi. There was a Deposition by Giovanni Rubini. A canvas of San Francesco di Girolamo was a copy of a work (1841) by Francesco Podesti. There was a St Francis Xavier by Clemente Ruta. In the sanctuary there was a St Peter and Paul on the Road to Martyrdom by Ercole Graziani. In the chapel of St Ignazio, there was a painting of the saint by Tagliassachi and a Sacred Heart of Jesus by Gaspare Landi. In the church there was also a canvas depicting St Stanislao Kostka, by Giovanni Gioseffo dal Sole There was a copy of an Annunciation by Guido Reni; an Archangel Raphael and Tobias attributed to Giovanni Bottani or his brother; a St Ursula by Marcantonio Franceschini; and a St Jerome, copy of a Guercino. The church had a portrait of Paolo Casati, a polymath jesuit. A painting in the church of St Ferdinand of Spain attributed to Antonia di Borbone, daughter of Duke Don Ferdinando.

See also
 List of Jesuit sites

Notes

Sources
La patria; geografia dell' Italia: Provincia di Parma e Piacenza, by Gustavo Chiesi, Torino, 1902, page 172.
Comune Piacenza entry on church.

Roman Catholic churches completed in 1587
16th-century Roman Catholic church buildings in Italy
Roman Catholic churches in Piacenza
Renaissance architecture in Piacenza